Homegrown may refer to any plants grown in a domestic setting. It may also refer to:

Music 
Home Grown, an American rock band formed in 1994
Home Grown (Geri Allen album), 1985
Homegrown (Dodgy album), 1995
Home Grown (Blue Mountain album), 1998
Homegrown (XTC album), 2001
Homegrown (UB40 album), 2003
Homegrown (New Zealand Idol album), 2004
Homegrown (Neil Young album), 2020
Homegrown (EP), a 2013 EP by rapper Chris Webby
Homegrown, a 1999 album by Michelle Malone
Home Grown, a 1972 album by Johnny Rivers
Home Grown! The Beginners Guide to Understanding The Roots, Vol. 1 & 2, a 2005 compilation albums by The Roots
Home Grown, aka KKUA Home Grown, a series of records produced by Hawaii's Ron Jacobs from 1976 to 1997
"Homegrown" (Zac Brown Band song), 2015
"Homegrown", a song by Neil Young from the 1977 album American Stars 'n Bars
Homegrown (drum and bass event), Cape Town based drum and bass event
Homegrown Music Festival (Duluth), a local music showcase in Duluth, Minnesota, US
Homegrown Music Festival (New Zealand), a festival of Kiwi music in Wellington, New Zealand

Other
Homegrown (film), a 1998 movie starring Billy Bob Thornton
Homegrown F.C., a football club in Naivasha, Kenya
Homegrown (play), a 2010 Canadian play about visiting a "homegrown" terrorist suspect

See also
Homegrown Cafe, a radio program in Ottawa, Ontario, Canada, during the 1980s and 1990s
Homegrown Cup, a collegiate basketball tournament in the Philippines
Homegrown Hollywood, a late-night UK TV show from 2005